Lorna Lewis (died June 1, 2013) was an American actress who moved to the UK in the 1970s. She remains best known for her role as Pet Simpson in two series of the BBC television drama Survivors between 1976 and 1977. Her other television work includes: The Wild Wild West, Doomwatch, mixed Blessings and Maelstrom.

She retired from acting in the late Eighties and entered the priesthood, having been ordained as a Deacon Curate in 2003 in the parish of Wye in Kent, England.

Filmography
Overlord (1975)

External links
 
 Career profile on Survivors site
 Obituary on the Wyeweb site
 "Survivors" newsletter

English television actresses
2013 deaths
Year of birth missing
American emigrants to England
American expatriates in England
American television actresses
English Anglicans
Alumni of RADA
21st-century British women